The Oaks is a greyhound racing competition held annually at Shelbourne Park.

First held at Harold's Cross in 1930, the event was unofficial until 1932. It is an original classic competition in the Irish racing greyhound racing calendar and was officially inaugurated in 1932 following the decision by the Irish Coursing Club to issue a new list of classic races.

The event was shared around several tracks in Ireland starting with Clonmel Greyhound Stadium from 1932-1933 and then the two Dublin venues of Shelbourne Park and Harold's Cross Stadium. Before World War II the old Cork Greyhound Stadium and Markets Field Greyhound Stadium in Limerick also both hosted the competition.

After the war Shelbourne Park and Harold's Cross both shared the race until sole control was taken by Shelbourne Park in 1992.

Past winners

Venues and distances
1932-1933 (Clonmel)
1930, 1934, 1936, 1938 (Harolds Cross)
1935, 1937 (Shelbourne Park)
1939, 1943 (Cork)
1942 (Limerick)
1944 Harolds Cross then alternate years with Shelbourne until 1970.
1970-1976, 1982, 1984, 1991 (Harolds Cross)
1977-1981, 1983, 1985-1990 & 1992-present (Shelbourne Park)

Sponsors
1978-1978 (Sean Kelly Dublin Bookmakers)
2003-present (Sporting Press)

References

Greyhound racing competitions in Ireland
Greyhound racing competitions in Dublin (city)
1932 establishments in Ireland
Recurring sporting events established in 1932
Sport in County Tipperary